Robert Edward Dunn (November 26, 1904 – August 26, 1978) was an American football player. He played college football for NYU and professional football in the National Football League (NFL) for the Staten Island Stapletons. He appeared in six NFL games, all as a starter, during the 1929 season.

References

1904 births
1978 deaths
NYU Violets football players
Staten Island Stapletons players
Players of American football from Connecticut
Sportspeople from Waterbury, Connecticut